Chernyshev is a rural locality (a khutor) in Zarevskoye Rural Settlement of Shovgenovsky District, the Republic of Adygea, Russia. The population was 763 as of 2018. There are 9 streets.

Geography 
Chernyshev is located 22 km west of Khakurinokhabl (the district's administrative centre) by road. Vesyoly is the nearest rural locality.

Ethnicity 
Chernyshev is inhabited by Russians and Ukrainians.

References 

Rural localities in Shovgenovsky District